Bajaga may refer to:
 Momčilo Bajagić, performing name Bajaga, Serbian rock musician
 Bajaga i Instruktori, a Serbian rock band fronted by Momčilo Bajagić